Tongkang Pechah（Jawi: توڠكڠ ڤچه, ）is a small town in Batu Pahat District, Johor, Malaysia. Its name was taken from the bauxite ore tongkang which sunk in Sungai Simpang Kiri (nearby the bridge which connected Batu Pahat and Tongkang Pechah).

Geography
The town spans over an area of 6.6 km2.

Economy
This small town is occupied with manufacturing factories in 1990s, including fabric factories and biscuit factories. Well-known biscuit factories (Hup Seng, Munchy and Hwa Tai) are located in this small town.

Neighbourhood
Bandar Putera Indah

References

Towns in Johor
Batu Pahat District